The second season of the American television series Supergirl, which is based on the DC Comics character Supergirl / Kara Zor-El, a costumed superheroine who is the cousin to Superman and one of the last surviving Kryptonians.

The season was ordered in May 2016, and unlike the first season which aired on CBS, this season was picked up by The CW. While the first season was filmed in Los Angeles, beginning with this season filming relocated to Vancouver, to reduce the high production costs of the series. The season was filmed from July 2016 to April 2017. Alongside Melissa Benoist, who stars in the titular role, principal cast members Mehcad Brooks, Chyler Leigh, Jeremy Jordan, and David Harewood return from the first season, and are joined by Chris Wood and Floriana Lima. Former series regular Calista Flockhart returns in a recurring capacity.

The season premiered on The CW on October 10, 2016, and ran until May 22, 2017, over 22 episodes. It received overall critical acclaim, being viewed as an improvement over the first season. The series was renewed for a third season on January 8, 2017.

Episodes

Cast and characters

Main
 Melissa Benoist as Kara Danvers / Kara Zor-El / Supergirl
 Mehcad Brooks as James Olsen / Guardian
 Chyler Leigh as Alex Danvers
 Jeremy Jordan as Winslow "Winn" Schott Jr.
 Floriana Lima as Maggie Sawyer
 Chris Wood as Mon-El / Mike Matthews
 David Harewood as J'onn J'onzz / Martian Manhunter and Hank Henshaw / Cyborg Superman

Recurring 
 Andrea Brooks as Eve Teschmacher
 Brenda Strong as Lillian Luthor
 Calista Flockhart as Cat Grant
 Ian Gomez as Snapper Carr
 Katie McGrath as Lena Luthor
 Tyler Hoechlin as Kal-El / Clark Kent / Superman
 Sharon Leal as Miss Martian / M'gann M'orzz
 Helen Slater as Eliza Danvers
 Tamzin Merchant as Lyra Strayd
 Teri Hatcher as Queen Rhea

Guest

Production

Development
On May 12, 2016, Warner Bros. Television announced that Supergirl had been renewed for a second season of 22 episodes and would move to The CW from CBS. Ali Adler and Andrew Kreisberg served as the season's showrunners. It was also announced that, beginning with this season, production would relocate to Vancouver from Los Angeles.

Writing
In the second season, Kara Danvers / Supergirl and James Olsen end their romantic relationship, in favor of maintaining a platonic one. Kreisberg said regarding this decision, "We realized that the best scenes between [Kara and James] were just the nice, sweet scenes where they were being friends." He also said that while the theme of the first season was "how does Kara become Supergirl?", the theme of the second would be "how does Supergirl become Kara?". Kriesberg said another theme of the season was "about coming into one's own and becoming who you are", such as Winn Schott becoming who he is by joining the Department of Extranormal Operations (DEO), and J'onn J'onzz embracing his Martian Manhunter persona, which he spent 300 years concealing, but does not have to any longer. The season is split in two-halves each with their own self-contained "big bad" story: Project Cadmus serves as the "big bad" of the first half, and Queen Rhea for the second half.

The season establishes that Alex Danvers is gay, with Maggie Sawyer being her partner. Chyler Leigh, who plays Alex, explained, "it's not like this thing that all of a sudden is just spilling out, it's a discovery for her". She added, "You have so many stories [...] where people are already established as gay, lesbian, bi[sexual]; these are people who are coming in like that" and described the second season as a "great opportunity to show somebody who's figuring it out, the light bulb moment and putting the puzzle pieces together." While the first season showed that the DEO operates in an isolated cave located "in the middle of nowhere", the second season shows that the DEO has relocated to their other base, a skyscraper in National City. Kreisberg explained that the creative team of Supergirl "fell out of love" with the DEO's cave setting, saying "It was cool in the beginning, and it just for some reason didn't feel like it was bringing everything together", hence the reason for shifting to the skyscraper setting.

Casting 
Melissa Benoist, Mehcad Brooks, Chyler Leigh, Jeremy Jordan, and David Harewood return from the first season as Kara Danvers / Supergirl, James Olsen, Alex Danvers, Winn Schott and J'onn J'onzz / Martian Manhunter, respectively. They are joined by Chris Wood and Floriana Lima, protraying Mon-El and Maggie Sawyer, respectively. Harewood also portrays Hank Henshaw, who becomes this series' version of Cyborg Superman. The season establishes Olsen as the vigilante Guardian, unlike the comics where Jim Harper is the vigilante. The producers decided to depict Sawyer as a Latino for the series, unlike the comics where she is a white blonde; however, the character's homosexuality was retained for the series.

With the move of production to Vancouver, it was unclear if Calista Flockhart, who played Cat Grant in the first season, would remain with the series, as her original contract stipulated that she work near her home in Los Angeles. The CW president Mark Pedowitz said Flockhart wanted to remain with the series and that "We're in ongoing discussions... we're happy to have her in [in whatever capacity] works out." Flockhart ultimately reached a deal to be recurring in the second season. Andrea Brooks originally auditioned for the role of Sawyer, although she herself admitted that she did not feel that role was a "good fit". She was subsequently sent a further script to audition for the role of Janice. Having won the role, it was not until she received her first episode script that she discovered she would in fact be playing the recurring role of Eve Teschmacher. The character's name is a reference to a character of the same name played by Valerie Perrine in Superman (1978) and its 1980 sequel. Katie McGrath also joined this season in the recurring role of Lena Luthor.

Design
Tyler Harron worked as the production designer for the season. With the move of the production to Vancouver from Los Angeles, Harron decided to take elements from the existing sets and rebuild them in Vancouver from scratch, rather than pack the sets such as CatCo and Kara Danver's loft, ship them to Vancouver and rebuild them there. This was done due to the difficulty of having separate crews to ship the sets to Vancouver and unpack them there. Kara's loft was designed to look almost exactly as it was in the first season, while CatCo was substantially redesigned.

Filming
The second season was filmed in Vancouver, rather than Los Angeles where the first season was shot. This was done to reduce the high production costs of the series, one of the issues that made CBS wary to renew the series on their network. Kriesberg explained that it "would've started to feel very small" if production had continued in Los Angeles, and that they chose to relocate to Vancouver to shoot in its outdoor locations, rather than continue facing the constraints of shooting mainly inside the studio at Los Angeles. Pedowitz said the series' move to Vancouver made crossovers with another CW superhero series, The Flash, "easier to facilitate" as the series also films in Vancouver. Filming for the season began in July 2016, and ended in April 2017.

Music 
The score for the season was composed by Blake Neely.

Arrowverse tie-ins 
The episode "Medusa" ends with a scene where Barry Allen and Cisco Ramon of Earth-1 arrive at Kara's loft enlisting her help with a problem on their Earth, thereby setting up the Arrowverse crossover event "Invasion!" that begins on The Flash season 3 episode 8, continues on Arrow season 5 episode 8 and concludes on Legends of Tomorrow season 2 episode 7. This scene is later repeated in the Flash episode of the crossover. Kara/Supergirl appears in all three episodes as a visitor to their universe due to Supergirl being set in a different Earth, referred to as Earth-38 by the inhabitants of the Arrowverse, and has been informally referred to as "Earth-CBS" by Arrow showrunner Marc Guggenheim, named for the network where Supergirl first aired. Similarly, the episode "Star-Crossed" ends with Music Meister hypnotizing Kara and fleeing to Earth-1 to do the same to Barry, thus initiating the events of The Flash season 3 episode "Duet".

Release

Broadcast
The season began airing on The CW on October 10, 2016, in the United States, and ended on May 22, 2017. It premiered on the same day as the United States in Canada on Showcase, and on October 24, 2016, in the United Kingdom on Sky One.

Home media
The season was released on DVD in Region 2 on August 21, 2017, on DVD and Blu-ray in Region 1 on August 22, and DVD Region 3 on August 23.

Reception

Ratings

Critical response
The review aggregator website Rotten Tomatoes gave the second season a 92% approval rating from critics with an average rating of 7.91/10, based on 19 reviews. The site's consensus reads, "The arrival of the more famous cousin in Supergirl does nothing to detract from the show's lead, who continues to deliver strength, action, and relatability." Metacritic, which uses a weighted average, assigned a score of 81 out of 100 based on 4 reviews, indicating "universal acclaim".

Jesse Schedeen of IGN rated the season 7.3 out of 10, giving the verdict, "In many ways, Supergirl improved in its second season as the show moved to The CW and bolstered its already solid cast with several new favorites. This season not only looked better, it managed to blend epic superhuman conflicts with very real, authentic character drama and a status quo marked by plenty of anti-alien sentiment in National City. But not every character benefited from the shake-ups this season, and not every lingering Season 1 problem was addressed. And while the season as a whole had more good elements than bad, the final trio of lackluster episodes managed to end the year on a real down note." Evan Valentine of Collider ranked the season at number 10 in his list of best and worst superhero television series of 2017, writing, "Supergirl is a stalwart within a sea of superhero shows, not necessarily standing out, but not ever being terrible. Melissa Benoist still does a fantastic job of portraying “the Girl of Steel,” but we are hitting Smallville-levels of drama with the rest of the characters".
PopMatters writer James Plath rated the season 7 out 10 stars.

Accolades

|-
! scope="row" rowspan="12" | 2017
| GLAAD Awards
| Outstanding Drama Series
| rowspan="2" | Supergirl
| 
| 
|-
| Kids' Choice Awards
| Favorite TV Show – Family Show
| 
| 
|-
| rowspan="4"| Saturn Awards
| Best Actress on Television
| Melissa Benoist
| 
| 
|-
| Best Guest Performance in a Television Series
| Tyler Hoechlin
| 
| 
|-
| Best Superhero Adaptation Television Series
| Supergirl
| 
| 
|-
| Best Supporting Actor on Television
| Mehcad Brooks
| 
| 
|-
| rowspan="6" | Teen Choice Awards
| Choice Action TV Actor
| data-sort-value="Wood, Chris" | Chris Wood
| 
| 
|-
| Choice Action TV Actress
| data-sort-value="Benoist, Melissa" | Melissa Benoist
| 
| 
|-
| Choice Action TV Show
| Supergirl
| 
| 
|-
| Choice Liplock
| data-sort-value="Benoist, Melissa and Chris Wood" | Melissa Benoist and Chris Wood
| 
| 
|-
| Choice TV Ship
| data-sort-value="Benoist, Melissa and Chris Wood" | Melissa Benoist and Chris Wood
| 
| 
|-
| Choice TV Villain
| data-sort-value="Hatcher, Terri" | Teri Hatcher
| 
| 
|}

References

External links
 
 

2016 American television seasons
2017 American television seasons
Supergirl (TV series) seasons